Dead Leaves is a 1998 road movie directed by German director Constantin Werner about a young man who travels from New York City to West Virginia with the corpse of his deceased girlfriend. As she decomposes, he slips further into madness.

Plot
When Laura (Elizabeth Gondek) dies, her unbalanced boyfriend Joey (Haim Abramsky) suffers a nervous breakdown. He steals the body and escapes on a self-destructive journey through a lonely autumn landscape of motels, freeways and rainy towns. At night he tries to preserve her fading beauty in strange rituals while remembering the happy and dark moments of their relationship. As she starts to decay physically, he descends mentally and emotionally. When he reaches the ocean shore he shoots himself to be united with her.

Cast
 Joey - Haim Abramsky
 Laura - Elizabeth Gondek

Poetry and music in the film
The film uses famous morbid poems recited as voice over as part of the narrative structure. The poems include "Annabel Lee" by Edgar Allan Poe and works by Baudelaire, Nerval, and Georg Trakl. Images of these poets as well as images of the musicians Rozz Williams and Ian Curtis are cut into the title sequence. The film's soundtrack includes a version of the previously unpublished ballad "Flowers" by Christian Death founder Rozz Williams. The song "Ship of Fools" was composed exclusively for the film's opening title sequence by singer/songwriter Gitane Demone.

Locations
The film was shot during a two-week road trip from New York City to West Virginia using a guerrilla filmmaking approach.

Release history
The film had its US premiere at the 1998 film festival of the American Film Institute in Los Angeles. It won the award "Best Film EXPO 1998" at the 1998 Festival Internacional de Cinema da Figueira da Foz in Portugal and was shown at the 1999 Mar del Plata International Film Festival and the 1999 Gothenburg Film Festival.

It was released in the US by underground distributor Cult Epics and Rykodisc in 2005.

References

External links 
 IMDB page

American road movies
1998 films
1990s English-language films
1990s American films